Magic Theater is the tenth studio album by new-age/jazz group Shadowfax.

Track listing 
 "Imaginary Islands" (Chuck Greenberg) – 4:23
 "Hey! Your Hat's On Backwards" (Stuart Nevitt) – 4:52
 "Secret Gathering" (Armen Chakmakian) – 5:06
 "Ebony Wind" (Greenberg) – 4:38
 "Castaneda's Boogie" (Phil Maggini) – 5:54
 "Baker's Dozen" (Greenberg) – 4:46
 "Night Passage" (Chakmakian) – 3:44
 "Remembrance" (Maggini) – 3:53
 "How Much Does Zimbabwe?" (Nevitt) – 4:54
 "The Spirit Door" (Maggini) – 6:24

Personnel 
 Armen Chakmakian – keyboards, piano, synthesizer
 Chuck Greenberg – alto flute, Lyricon, soprano saxophone, tenor saxophone, woodwind
 Phil Maggini – bass, upright bass, flute, fretless bass, keyboards, vocals
 Stuart Nevitt – bass, electric bass, cymbals, drums, electric drums, snare drum, percussion, sound effects, vocals

Additional personnel
 Andy Abad – acoustic guitar, electric guitar
 Aaron Gross – dumbek
 Danny Heines – acoustic guitar, electric guitar, lap steel guitar
 Glenn Morrison – flugelhorn
 Ramon Yslas – bongos, chimes, congas, percussion, shaker, sound effects

References

1994 albums
Shadowfax (band) albums